Tom Stone is the stage name of Thomas Bengtsson, a Swedish magician, editor and author.

Biography 
Stone was born on October 28, 1967, and presently lives in Stockholm, Sweden.

He is best known for writing a series of articles and pamphlets about original magical techniques and plots. He co-wrote a book with magician Lennart Green, contributed material to a book by Jason Alford, and has self-published a series of pamphlets as well as an e-book. He is also editor and publisher of various Swedish magic journals such as "Trollkarlen", and "Dr. Faustus Journal" (1995-).

He has performed at the invitation-only Magic Castle, and in 2000, he was a "performer and speaker" at the FISM "World Championships of Magic" in Lisbon, Portugal.

In 2003, he was a performer and competitor at the International Magic Convention & 20th Close Up competition in Kings Cross, London, where he won £500 and was awarded second place, just behind Japanese-Canadian magician Hayashi.

In June 2010, Stone released a book entitled "Vortex", collecting many of the effects he has published in periodicals, his own ebooks and some previously unreleased material with Hermetic Press.

In May 2016, the Academy of Magical Arts in Hollywood awarded Stone the Creative Fellowship.

Works 
 The Warpsmith's Toolbox, 1994 (self published)
 Lennart Green's Snap Deal, 1995 (co-written with Lennart Green)
 The Warpsmith Returns, 1996 (self published)
 Self publishing, e-book (self published)
 Tom Stone Caught On Tape
Vortex (Published through Hermetic Press), June 2010. 
Maelstrom (Published through Hermetic Press), December 2011.

Notes

References

 Tom Stone's website, including his personal list of works
 Genii, the Conjurors' Magazine
 "Review of The Warpsmith's Toolbox", March 1994
 "Review of The Warpsmith Returns", August 1996
 "Venetian Deck", August 2005, pp 30
 Magic magazine, May 1996: "Review of The Warpsmith Returns"
 Magic Times, December 2003 - Stone's upcoming appearance at 2003 International Magic Convention in London
 Channel One magazine, Issue 3: "Work in Progress"
 "Stockholm Magic Bar" video clip, May 19, 2005. (Swedish language). Second half of brief (amateur) clip shows sleight of hand improvisations, by Tom Stone
 "5 Greatest close-up magicians" video clip, January, 2005. (Japanese overdub). Clip shows original sleight of hand magic, by Tom Stone
 (Swedish) Magiarkivet.se - lists many works related to magic industry, including Stone's titles
 Magicpatter.com English-language bibliography listing Stone's works
 (French) Arcane magazine, 2000 - About Stone's participation with FISM 2000
 Australia's Magic Monthly, July 2000, "FISM 2000." archived copy
  (Japanese) World Magic Friends Convention, 1999

1967 births
Academy of Magical Arts Creative Fellowship winners
Tom Stone
Living people
Tom Stone
Swedish male writers
Swedish magicians